Henry Lee Fambrough (born May 10, 1938) is an original vocalist and current member of the R&B quintet The Spinners (aka The Detroit Spinners and also The Motown Spinners).  He is the last surviving original member of the Spinners.

The group formed in 1954 as the Domingoes before changing their name to the Spinners. Fambrough was drafted into the army in 1961, and on his return two years later, the Spinners signed up under Motown Records. They didn't have any big hits for the next six years, and Fambrough ended up working as a chauffeur for the label boss’ mother. During the group's heyday from the early to mid-1970s, Henry served as one of the group's three lead singers (along with Philippé Wynne and Bobby Smith) and his rich baritone provided lead vocals for the Spinners classic "I Don't Want To Lose You," as well as co-lead vocals with Wynne on "Living A Little, Laughing A Little".  On the group's classic single "Ghetto Child," he shared leads with Wynne and Smith.  He also dueted with Dionne Warwick on the Spinners' "Just As Long As We Have Love," from their 1975 album Pick of the Litter, and also sang lead on the classic album cut "If You Can't Be in Love," from the album Happiness Is Being with the Spinners (1976).  Henry was noted for the whiplash moustache he wore at that time.

Notes

References
 Romanski, Patricia and Holly George-Warren (eds). The Rolling Stone Encyclopedia of Rock & Roll. New York, NY: Fireside, 2005.

External links
 Tom Meros, "The Spinners' Henry Fambrough talks to Tom about their history", YouTube.

1938 births
Living people
American rhythm and blues singers
The Spinners (American group) members
20th-century African-American male singers